Hertford North railway station is one of two stations serving the town of Hertford in Hertfordshire, England, the other being Hertford East railway station.

Location 
Stations on the line include Stevenage, Watton-at-Stone, Bayford and Cuffley. Trains on this line are run by Great Northern. It has one terminal and two through platforms and features a lift (to platforms 2 and 3), a small shop, two ticket booths and ticket barriers.

Platform layout
Platform 1 is mainly used for trains to Moorgate, originating in Stevenage. Platform 2 is mainly used for trains originating in London proceeding north to Stevenage. Platform 3 is a bay platform used only as a terminus for trains from London.

Services
All services at Hertford North are operated by Great Northern using  EMUs.

The typical off-peak service in trains per hour is:
 2 tph to 
 2 tph to 

During the peak hours, the station is served by an additional half-hourly service to Moorgate which start and terminate at Hertford North.

References

External links

Railway stations in Hertfordshire
DfT Category C2 stations
Former London and North Eastern Railway stations
Railway stations in Great Britain opened in 1924
Railway stations served by Govia Thameslink Railway
Buildings and structures in Hertford